Ismene is a genus of moths of the family Crambidae. It contains only one species, Ismene pelusia, which is found in Egypt.

References

Taxa named by Marie Jules César Savigny
Crambinae